Zamano plc was an Internet and mobile technology company based in Dublin. The company decided in February 2017 to bring their premium rate SMS business lines to a close by the end of 2017. In November 2018, Zamano plc issued a press release stating that it was entering voluntary liquidation. A liquidator was appointed in early 2019.

History 
The company was founded in 2000. During 2002, Zamano reportedly partnered with RTÉ Interactive to launch several mobile and SMS-based games. Later in 2002, Zamano acquired Avoca's interactive SMS business. This provided the company with 10 premium rate SMS short codes covering four UK mobile networks.

In 2007, Zamano completed the acquisitions of Red Circle Technologies and Eirborne. The company's IPO, in early 2007, coincided with these of acquisitions.

In 2011, Zamano announced an investment in a new entity called Newsworthie. However, investment in Newsworthie was ended in October 2011 with outgoing CEO John O'Shea announcing that "As our investment capacity is limited, we intend focusing it entirely on opportunities related to our mobile expertise, and have suspended further investment in Newsworthie." O'Shea departed the company as CEO in November 2011 and was replaced by interim-CEO Pat Landy in a temporary role.

In April 2015, Zamano, signed a deal with Three mobile to allow the company's technology to be used as a conduit by e-commerce providers.

In 2017 the company announced plans to close parts of its business, and by September 2017 it was suggested that the company, following a management buyout, was considering investing in oil and gas exploration companies. By late 2018, the company announced its liquidation, and a liquidator was appointed in 2019.

Products 
Zamano offered products for mobile messaging, mobile payments and mobile advertising. Everneo was a division of Zamano that offered mobile and cloud video, video clubs, mobile games, apps, entertainment portals, ringtones, wallpapers, screensavers, SMS services, and IVR lines.

In November 2013, Zamano launched Message Hero, an online business SMS service available to customers in Ireland and the UK

Recognition 
Zamano appeared in the Deloitte Technology Fast 50 from 2006 to 2009.
This followed from coming second in Deloitte's "rising star" category in 2005.

In 2002, Zamano was nominated for an Annual Global Mobile Award, in the Best Mobile Internet Application category for its TxT Manager.

Controversy 

On 4 February 2010, the UK phone service regulator PhonepayPlus fined and formally reprimanded Zamano £15,000 for breaching its terms and conditions in relation to unsolicited reverse-charge premium rate SMS messages. PhonepayPlus also ordered Zamano to issue refunds. On 29 March 2012, Zamano was fined a further £35,000 by PhonepayPlus for breaching its terms and conditions in relation to unsolicited reverse-charge premium rate SMS messages.

Between May 2012 and September 2013 Zamano received 587 complaints from consumers in relation to a competition service, "Play2Win". Consumers stated that they had received unsolicited, reverse-billed text messages and that they had not engaged with the service, or acknowledged engaging with the service but stated that they believed it was free. A Phonepayplus tribunal found that Zamano breached the Fairness and Misleading aspects of its code. Given repeated breaches of the code by Zamano, the tribunal imposed an increased fine of £40,000

References 

Companies based in Dublin (city)
Technology companies established in 2000
Technology companies disestablished in 2018
Internet companies of Ireland
Mobile web
Mobile technology companies
2007 initial public offerings